Roberto Huber (21 February 1927 – 1 March 2008) was a Chilean sports shooter. He competed in the 50 metre rifle, prone event at the 1964 Summer Olympics.

References

1927 births
2008 deaths
Chilean male sport shooters
Olympic shooters of Chile
Shooters at the 1964 Summer Olympics
Sportspeople from Santiago